The Continental IO-550 engine is a large family of 9 liter fuel injected six-cylinder, horizontally opposed, air-cooled aircraft engines that were developed for use in light aircraft by Teledyne Continental Motors. The first IO-550 was delivered in 1983 and the type remains in production.

The IOF-550 is an Aerosance FADEC equipped version of the same basic engine, the TSIO-550 is a dual turbocharged version and the TSIOL-550 is a liquid-cooled variant.

There is no O-550 engine, which would be a carburetor-equipped variant, hence the base model is the IO-550.

This engine family competes with the Lycoming IO-580 series which are also six-cylinder engines with similar power output and weight.

Design and development

The IO-550 family of engines was developed from the IO-520 series, with the stroke increased from 4.00 to 4.25 inches, increasing the displacement to 552 in³ (9.05 L).

The engines were first developed in the early 1980s and first certified on a regulatory basis of FAR 33, 1 February 1965 amendment, 33-8, 2 May 1977. The first IO-550 model was certified on 13 October 1983.

Variants
IO-550-A
 at 2700 rpm, dry weight . Certified 13 October 1983.
IO-550-B
 at 2700 rpm, dry weight . Certified 13 October 1983.
IO-550-C
 at 2700 rpm, dry weight . Certified 13 October 1983.
IO-550-D
 at 2700 rpm, dry weight . Certified 23 June 1988.
IO-550-E
 at 2700 rpm, dry weight . Certified 20 December 1989.
IO-550-F
 at 2700 rpm, dry weight . Similar to the IO-550-A,B & C, with a top-mounted induction system and 12-quart oil sump. Certified 23 June 1988.
IO-550-G
 at 2500 rpm, dry weight . Certified 17 March 1989.
IO-550-L
 at 2700 rpm, dry weight . Certified 23 June 1988.
IO-550-N
 at 2700 rpm, dry weight . Similar to the IO-550-G with increased power rating. Certified 16 August 1996.
IO-550-P
 at 2700 rpm, dry weight . Similar to the IO-550-N with oil sump from the IO-550-L. Certified 1 March 2000.
IO-550-R
 at 2700 rpm, dry weight . Similar to the IO-550-N but with the oil sump, oil suction tube and mount legs from the IO-550-B. Certified 1 March 2000.

FADEC models
IOF-550-B
 at 2700 rpm, dry weight . Similar to the IO-550-B with an Aerosance FADEC fuel and ignition control system. Certified 4 February 2002.
IOF-550-C
 at 2700 rpm, dry weight . Similar to the IO-550-C with an Aerosance FADEC fuel and ignition control system. Certified 4 February 2002.
IOF-550-D
 at 2700 rpm, dry weight . Similar to the IO-550-D with an Aerosance FADEC fuel and ignition control system. Certified 4 February 2002.
IOF-550-E
 at 2700 rpm, dry weight . Similar to the IO-550-E with an Aerosance FADEC fuel and ignition control system. Certified 4 February 2002.
IOF-550-F
 at 2700 rpm, dry weight . Similar to the IO-550-F with an Aerosance FADEC fuel and ignition control system. Certified 4 February 2002.
IOF-550-L
 at 2700 rpm, dry weight . Similar to the IO-550-L with an Aerosance FADEC fuel and ignition control system. Certified 4 February 2002.
IOF-550-N
 at 2700 rpm, dry weight . Similar to the IO-550-N with an Aerosance FADEC fuel and ignition control system. Certified 4 February 2002.
IOF-550-P
 at 2700 rpm, dry weight . Similar to the IO-550-P with an Aerosance FADEC fuel and ignition control system. Certified 4 February 2002.
IOF-550-R
 at 2700 rpm, dry weight . Similar to the IO-550-R with an Aerosance FADEC fuel and ignition control system. Certified 4 February 2002.

Turbocharged models
TSIO-550-A
 at 2600 rpm, dry weight  plus two turbochargers of  each.
TSIO-550-B
 at 2700 rpm, dry weight  plus two turbochargers of  each. Similar to the TSIO-550-A except with a 12 quart sump, sonic venturii removed and the two stage fuel pump replaced by a single stage fuel pump.
TSIO-550-C
 at 2600 rpm, dry weight  plus two turbochargers of  each.
TSIO-550-E
 at 2700 rpm, dry weight  plus two turbochargers of  each. Similar to TSIO-550-C with the oil sump and maximum continuous power rating of the TSIO-550-B.
TSIO-550-G
 at 2700 rpm, dry weight  plus two turbochargers of  each. Similar to the TSIO-550-E with smaller surface area intercoolers, different oil sump capacity and power rating.
TSIO-550-K
 at 2500 rpm, dry weight  plus two turbochargers of  each. Similar to the TSIO-550-E with new oil sump and capacity, decreased maximum continuous power, increased turbo boost pressure, decreased engine speed rating and tapered cylinder barrel fins.

Turbocharged & FADEC models

TSIOF-550-D
 at 2600 rpm, dry weight  plus two turbochargers of  each. Similar to the TSIOF-550-J except the exhaust system and low voltage harness.
TSIOF-550-J
 at 2600 rpm, dry weight  plus two turbochargers of  each. Similar to the TSIO-550-E except for FADEC fuel injection and ignition control, turbochargers, tapered cylinder barrel fins, oil sump and capacity, maximum continuous speed and manifold pressure rating.
TSIOF-550-K
 at 2500 rpm, dry weight  plus two turbochargers of  each. Similar to the TSIO-550-K but with FADEC fuel injection and ignition control.

Liquid-cooled models
TSIOL-550-A
 at 2700 rpm, dry weight . Similar to the TSIO-520-NB but with a new cylinder design that uses liquid cooling. The coolant manifold is on top of the cylinder head, with a coolant pump fitted to the starter adapter, driven by the starter adapter shaft and the oil cooler is mounted on the airframe, not the engine. The engine has an AiResearch TA81 turbocharger.
TSIOL-550-B
 at 2700 rpm, dry weight . Similar to the TSIO-520-UB but with a new cylinder design that uses liquid cooling. The coolant manifold is on top of the cylinder head, with a coolant pump fitted to the starter adapter, driven by the propeller shaft using sheaves, the oil cooler is mounted on the airframe, not the engine. A coolant tank and coolant lines are added to the installation. The engine has an AiResearch TS06 turbocharger.
TSIOL-550-C
 at 2600 rpm, dry weight . Similar to the TSIOL-550-A but with the exhaust system and turbocharger bracket from the TSIOL-550-B. The engine is modified to accept the AiResearch TA81 turbocharger. Neither oil nor coolant radiators are provided with the engine.

Geared models
GIO-550-A
A special non-certified geared engine developed for the RU-38 Twin Condor covert reconnaissance aircraft, incorporating 3:2 gear reduction to 2267 rpm.

Applications

IO-550
Beechcraft Baron
Beechcraft Bonanza
Bellanca 17-30
Cessna 182 (STC SA09133SC, modification)
Cessna 206 (modification)
Cessna 210 (modification)
Cessna 350
Cirrus SR22
Cirrus VK-30
Freedom Aviation Phoenix
Lancair Barracuda
Lancair ES
Lancair Legacy
Mooney M20
Seawind 300C
Velocity XL-RG
Washington T-411 Wolverine
Yakovlev Yak-112

TSIO-550
Adam A500
Cessna 400
Lancair IV
Mooney M20TN
Velocity TXL-RG
Cirrus SR22T

TSIOF-550
Diamond DA50
Cobalt Co50 Valkyrie
KAI KC-100

TSIOL-550
Extra EA-400
Viper Aircraft Viperfan

GIO-550
RU-38 Twin Condor

Specifications (IO-550-A)

See also

References

External links

Continental Specification Sheet IO-550-N

1980s aircraft piston engines
Boxer engines
IO-550